Valerie Virginia Hunt (July 22, 1916 – February 24, 2014) was an American scientist, author, and former professor of Physiological Science at the University of California, Los Angeles.

Biography
Hunt was born in 1916 in Larwill, Indiana. She retired from UCLA in 1980. Her work influenced the development of dance/movement therapy. She died in 2014 at the age of 97.

Select publications

References

External links
 Bio

University of California, Los Angeles faculty
1916 births
2014 deaths